San Possidonio is a comune (municipality) in the Province of Modena in the Italian region Emilia-Romagna, located about  northwest of Bologna and about  northeast of Modena.

San Possidonio borders the following municipalities: Cavezzo, Concordia sulla Secchia, Mirandola, Novi di Modena.

Twin towns
San Possidonio is twinned with:

  Vinay, Isère, France, since 2013

References

Cities and towns in Emilia-Romagna